Anatoli Dmitrievich Papanov (31 October 1922 — 5 August 1987) was a Soviet and Russian actor, drama teacher, and theatre director at the Moscow Satire Theatre where he served for almost 40 years. A prominent character actor, Papanov is mostly remembered for his comedy roles in a duo with his friend Andrei Mironov, although he had many dramatic roles as well. As a voice actor he contributed to over hundred cartoons. He was named People's Artist of the USSR in 1973 and awarded the USSR State Prize posthumously.

Early and war years
Anatoli Papanov was born in Vyazma, Smolensk Governorate (modern-day Smolensk Oblast, Russia) into a mixed Russian-Polish family. His father Dmitry Filippovich Papanov (1897—1982) was a retired soldier who served as a railway guard and an amateur actor at the local theatre founded by Nikolai Plotnikov, where Anatoli and his sister also performed as children. His mother Elena Boleslavovna Roskovskaya (1901—1973) was a Belarus-born Polish milliner who secretly converted from Roman Catholicism to Russian Orthodoxy. Anatoli himself was raised in Orthodox traditions.

In 1930 the family moved to Moscow. As a schoolboy Papanov attended drama courses, then went on to work as a caster at a factory, simultaneously performing in a popular theatre studio for factory workers organized by Vakhtangov Theatre actors led by Vasili Kuza whom Papanov later considered his first teacher. During the late 1930s he made a number of uncredited appearances in movies, such as a sailor in Lenin in October (1937) or a passerby in The Foundling (1939).

In 1941, after the invasion of the Soviet Union, Papanov joined the Red Army and left for the front line. As a senior sergeant he headed an anti-aircraft warfare platoon. In June 1942, he was badly wounded by an explosion and lost two toes on his right foot. He spent six months in a military hospital and was sent home as disabled, and for the next several years he could only walk with a cane. In 1985 he was awarded the 1st class Order of the Patriotic War.

Despite his injury, in 1943 Papanov entrolled as a student in the acting faculty of the State Institute of Theatre Arts, taking courses with Vasili Orlov. During his studies he met his future wife, a fellow student Nadezhda Yurievna Karatayeva (born 1924), who had also served in the war as a nurse on a hospital train. They married on 20 May 1945, ten days after the end of the war.

Career

Theatre
In 1946, after graduating from the State Institute, Papanov left for Klaipėda, Lithuanian SSR, along with other students. There, they founded a Klaipėda Russian Drama Theatre, where he performed for several years. In 1948 Andrey Goncharov suggested he join the Moscow Satire Theatre, where he continued to act up until his death, performing in about 50 plays.

Among his popular roles were Alexander Koreiko in The Little Golden Calf (1958), Kisa Vorobyaninov in The Twelve Chairs (1960, both based on the novels by Ilf and Petrov), Vasily Tyorkin in Aleksandr Tvardovsky's Tyorkin in the Other World (1966), Anton Antonovich in Nikolai Gogol's The Government Inspector (1972), Nikolai Shubin in Grigori Gorin's and Arkady Arkanov's Little Comedies of the Big House (1973), Pavel Famusov in Alexander Griboyedov's Woe from Wit (1976), Roman Khludov in Mikhail Bulgakov's Flight (1977), Leonid Gayev in Anton Chekhov's The Cherry Orchard (1984), and others.

Apart from performing, Papanov also taught acting at the Russian Institute of Theatre Arts, and in 1986 he staged his first and last play, The Last Ones by Maxim Gorky. Being a devout Christian, Papanov wanted to end it with a prayer. To avoid possible censorship, he used a radio record of Feodor Chaliapin performing a prayer.

Cinema
During the 1960s, Papanov began regularly appearing in films. He performed leading roles in the comedies Come Tomorrow, Please... (1962), directed by Yevgeny Tashkov, and Children of Don Quixote (1965), directed by Yevgeny Karelov, and appeared in several comedies by Eldar Ryazanov, including The Man from Nowhere (1961), where he played four roles at once. It didn't bring him any fame, though, as the movie was heavily criticized upon release and quickly banned for 25 years straight.

Papanov became very famous, however, after his work as General Serpilin in Aleksandr Stolper's war drama The Alive and the Dead (1964). For this role he was awarded the Vasilyev Brothers State Prize of the RSFSR and the main prize at the First All-Union Film Festival, and Konstantin Simonov personally lauded his work.

In 1966, Eldar Ryazanov released Beware of the Car, in which Papanov appeared alongside his friend Andrei Mironov, with Mironov as a modern-day black marketeer, and Papanov as his father-in-law, a war veteran who mocks him all the way through. Its popularity led Leonid Gaidai to cast them in his 1968 comedy The Diamond Arm as the main antagonists, a pair of smugglers who tried to get their hands on the hero's "diamond arm". The film was seen by 76.7 million people on the year of release, becoming the third most popular Soviet movie of all time. In 1971, Gaidai also tried both actors for the leading parts in his adaptation of The Twelve Chairs, but decided otherwise. In 1976, Mark Zakharov directed his own TV adaptation of the book and eventually cast both actors in the leading roles, reuniting them for the last time.

Papanov was also highly sought-after by animation directors. His distinguishing growling voice suited all kind of beasts such as Shere Khan from The Adventures of Mowgli (1967), a Soviet adaptation of The Jungle Book. His most popular characters, though, were wolves, especially after he voiced the Wolf character in the top-rated animated series Well, Just You Wait! (1969—1986), which has been considered his best role, overshadowing all of his other work, to his great displeasure.

Death and memory

Papanov suffered from chronic heart failure. In 1987, he performed his last role in the tragic drama The Cold Summer of 1953. After work on the movie was finished, Papanov returned from Karelia to his Moscow flat and decided to take a shower although the hot water was off that day. He died in the bath from a heart attack. Just eleven days later, his long-time friend and co-star Andrei Mironov would die from a cerebral hemorrhage.

Papanov was buried in Novodevichy Cemetery in Moscow. He was survived by his wife, actress Nadezhda Karatayeva who also performed at the Moscow Satire Theatre, and their daughter Elena Papanova, a theatre and film actress.

Asteroid No. 2480 is named after Papanov.

In 2012 a monument in memory of Papanov was opened in his native Vyazma.

One of the streets in Mikhaylovsk, Stavropol Krai is named after the actor.

Selected filmography

Movies 

 Lenin in October (1937) as sailor (uncredited)
 The Foundling (1939) as passerby (uncredited)
 Minin and Pozharsky (1939) as peasant boy (uncredited)
 Composer Glinka (1952) as aide-de-camp
 The Inspector-General (1952) as official (uncredited)
 How Robinson Was Created (almanac "Absolutely Seriously", 1961) as chief editor
 Man Follows the Sun (1961) as super
 The Cossacks (1961) as cornet
 The Man from Nowhere (1961) as Arkady Krokhalyov / tribal chief / theatre actor / bully
 A Trip Without a Load (1962) as Akim Sevastyanovich
 Come Tomorrow, Please... (1962) as Nikolay Vasilievich (voiced by Yevgeny Tashkov)
 The Alive and the Dead (1964) as major general Fyodor Serpilin
 The Green Flame (1964) as Boris Zhmurkin
 Children of Don Quixote (1965) as Pyotr Bondarenko
 Our House (1965) as father
 Give me a complaints book (1965) as a maître d'hôtel Vasily Kutaytsev
 Going Inside a Storm (1965) as Anykeyev, the head of the lab
 Beware of the Car (1966) as Sokol-Kruzhkin, Semitsvetov's father-in-law
 Retribution (1967) as major general Fyodor Serpilin
 Seven Old Men and a Girl (1968) as legal adviser
 Two Comrades Were Serving (1968) as regimental commander
 The Diamond Arm (1968) as Lyolik the smuggler
 The Golden Calf (1968) as Vasisualy Lokhankin (deleted scene)
 The Adjutant of His Excellency (1969) as Evgeniy Angel
 Belorussian station (1970) as Nikolai Dubinsky
 All The King's Men (1971) as Burden Sr.
 Gentlemen of Fortune (1971) as chess player in a hotel
 The Bad Good Man (1973) as Samoilenko the doctor
 Eleven Hopes (1975) as Vorontsov
 The Twelve Chairs (1976) as Kisa Vorobianinov
 Mama, I'm Alive (1977) as Lopatkin the home owner
 Incognito from St. Petersburg (1977) as mayor Anton Antonovich Skvoznik-Dmuhanovsky
 Domestic Circumstances (1977) as male nanny
 Engineer Graftio (1979) as Genrikh Graftio
 Comic Lover, or Love Escapades of Sir John Falstaff (1983) as Falstaff
 The Cold Summer of 1953 (1987) as Nikolai "Kopalych" Starobogatov (voiced by Igor Yefimov)

Animation 
 The Key (1961) as Zmei Gorynich
 A Little Frog Is looking for His Father (1964) as Crocodile
 Fitil (1964—1984) as various roles
 Rikki-Tikki-Tavi (1965) as Nag
 Adventures of Mowgli (1967—1971) as Shere Khan
 The Little Mermaid (1968) as guide
 Well, Just You Wait! (1969—1994, 18 episodes) as Wolf (voice samples in episodes 17—18)
 Happy Merry-Go-Round № 5 (1973) as Nikodim
 Sack of Apples (1974) as Wolf
 Ded Moroz And a Gray Wolf (1978) as Wolf
 A Flying Ship (1979) as Vodyanoy
 The Three on Island (1986) as pirate

References

External links

Anatoli Papanov. A Short Biography of the Great Actor

1922 births
1987 deaths
20th-century Russian male actors
People from Vyazma
People from Vyazemsky Uyezd
Russian Academy of Theatre Arts alumni
Honored Artists of the RSFSR
People's Artists of the RSFSR
People's Artists of the USSR
Recipients of the Order of the Red Banner of Labour
Recipients of the USSR State Prize
Recipients of the Vasilyev Brothers State Prize of the RSFSR
Russian male child actors
Russian male film actors
Russian male stage actors
Russian male voice actors
Russian people of Polish descent
Russian people of World War II
Soviet male child actors
Soviet male film actors
Soviet male stage actors
Soviet male voice actors
Soviet military personnel of World War II
Burials at Novodevichy Cemetery